The Makaa–Njem languages are a group of Bantu languages spoken in Cameroon, the Central African Republic, Equatorial Guinea, Gabon and the Republic of the Congo. They are coded Zone A.80 in Guthrie's classification.

According to Nurse & Philippson (2003), adding the Kako languages (Guthrie's A.90) forms a valid node, called Pomo–Bomwali (Kairn Klieman 1997).

Languages

Kako 
The Guthrie Kako (A.90) languages are:
 Kwakum
 Pol
 Pomo-Kweso (Pomo, Kweso)
 Kako.

Makaa–Njem 
The Guthrie Makaa–Njem (A.80) languages are:

Maho (2009) adds Shiwe (Oshieba) of central Gabon.

Glottolog classifies the languages as follows:

 Makaa–Kako (A.80-90) languages:
 Kako (or Mkako, Nkoxo, Dikaka, Yaka)
 Kwakum (or Kpakum, Pakum, Bakum, Abakum, Abakoum, Akpwakum)
 Pol (or Pol, Pori, Pul) (Azom, Polri Kinda)
 Pomo-Kweso (Pomo, Kweso)
 Makaa–Njem (A.80) languages
 Bomwali (or Bomali, Boumoali, Bumali, Lino, Sangasanga)
 Yambe
 Mpoic languages:
 Mpongmpong (or Mpumpong, Pongpong, Mpompo, Mpopo, Mbombo, Bombo)
 Bekwil (or Bekwie, Bekwel, Bakwil, Bakwele, Okpele)
 Njemic languages:
 Koonzime (or Kooncimo, Koozhime, Koozime, Nzime)
 Njyem (or Nyem, Njem, Ndjem, Ndjeme, Ndzem, Ngyeme, Djem, Dzem)
 Mpiemo–Ukhwejo languages:
 Mpiemo (or Mpyemo, Mbyemo, Mbimou, Mbimu, Bimu, Mpo)
 Ukhwejo (or Benkonjo)
 Western A80 languages:
 Mvumboic languages:
 Gyele (or Guiele, Giele, Gieli, Gyeli, Bogyeli, Bondjiel, Bajeli, Babinga, Bakola, Bakuele, Bekoe, Likoya)
 Kwasio (or Kwassio, Bisio, Bissio, Bisiwo, Bujeba, Mabi, Mabea, Ngumba, Mgoumba, Ngoumba, Mvumbo)
 Shiwe (or Shiwa, Chiwa, Oshieba, Ossyeba)
 Makaaic languages:
 Byep-Besep (or North Makaa) (Byep, Besep)
 Makaa (or South Makaa)
 Kol (or Bikele-Bikay, Bikele-Bikeng, Bikélé, and Bekol)
 So (or Sso, Swo, Shwo, Fo)

Notes

References

Gordon, Raymond G., Jr. (ed.) (2005). Ethnologue: Languages of the World, 15th ed. Dallas: SIL International. Retrieved 7 June 2006.

Cameroon-related lists